Tail of a Tiger is a 1984 Australian film directed by Rolf de Heer and starring Grant Navin. It de Heer's first feature.

Production
Tail of a Tiger was filmed in Sydney, Australia.

References

External links

Australian children's films
1984 films
Films directed by Rolf de Heer
Films shot in Sydney
1984 directorial debut films
1980s English-language films
1980s Australian films